Ausreißer aka The Runaway is a 2004 German short film starring Peter Jordan and Maximilian Werner. On 31 January 2006 it was nominated for the Academy Award for Best Live Action Short Film.

External links 
 

2004 films
German drama short films
2000s German films